is a Japanese former footballer.

Career statistics

Club

Notes

References

1988 births
Living people
Japanese footballers
Japanese expatriate footballers
Association football forwards
Singapore Premier League players
SC Sagamihara players
Albirex Niigata Singapore FC players
Japanese expatriate sportspeople in Singapore
Expatriate footballers in Singapore